The First Lutheran hymnal, published in 1524 as Etlich Cristlich lider / Lobgesang und Psalm (Some Christian songs / canticle, and psalm), often also often referred to as the Achtliederbuch (Book with eight songs, literally Eightsongsbook), was the first Lutheran hymnal.

History and content 

The hymnal was created by Martin Luther and Paul Speratus working in collaboration. It contains eight hymns: four by Luther, three by Speratus, and one anonymous, which has been attributed to Justus Jonas. The creators declared their intentions on the title page: "Lobgesang / un Psalm / dem rainen wort Gottes gemeß / auß der heylige schrifft / durch mancherley hochgelerter gemacht / in der Kirch zu singen / wie es dann zum tayl Berayt in Wittenberg in übung ist." (Canticle / and psalm / according to the pure word of God / from the holy scripture / made by several learned [people] / to be sung in church / as already practised in part in Wittenberg.)

The hymnal is rather "eine lose buchhändlerische Zusammenfassung", a loose collection of songs which existed as broadsheets, than a hymnal with a concept. It was printed around the turn of the year 1523/1524 in Nuremberg by Jobst Gutknecht. The title page showed Wittenberg as the location of print. The booklet of twelve pages contained eight songs on five different melodies.

The little hymnal was distributed in Europe. Luther's adversaries complained that "the whole people are singing themselves into his doctrines." Because of the great demand, another collection was published the same year, the Erfurt Enchiridion, containing 26 hymns, 18 of them by Luther.

Songs

  (Luther)
  (Speratus)
  (Speratus) (German Wikisource page)
  (Speratus)
  (Luther)
  (Luther)
  (Luther)
  (anonymous, setting for two voices)

See also 

 Metrical psalter

Lutheran
 Erfurt Enchiridion
 Eyn geystlich Gesangk Buchleyn
 Swenske songer eller wisor 1536
 Thomissøn's hymnal

Anabaptist
 Ausbund

Anglican
Book of Common Prayer
Whole Book of Psalms

Presbyterian
Book of Common Order
Scottish Psalter

Reformed
Souterliedekens
Genevan Psalter

Sources
 Konrad Ameln (ed.): Das Achtliederbuch, facsimile Nürnberg, 1523/24,  2, 1956 

From The “Eight Songs,” Wittenberg, 1524. With English Translations and Music, as part of the Online Library of Liberty: A collection of scholarly works about individual liberty and free markets.

References

External links
Stephen A. Crist Video- An Introduction to the Achtliederbuch, held by Pitts Theology Library at Emory University
Achtliederbuch Portal zu Bibliotheken, Archiven, Museen 2011

Reformation in Germany
Lutheran hymnals
1524 books
1524 establishments in the Holy Roman Empire
16th-century Christian texts